The Second Battle of Franklin was fought on November 30, 1864, in Franklin, Tennessee, as part of the Franklin–Nashville Campaign of the American Civil War. It was one of the worst disasters of the war for the Confederate States Army. Confederate Lt. Gen. John Bell Hood's Army of Tennessee conducted numerous frontal assaults against fortified positions occupied by the Union forces under Maj. Gen. John Schofield and was unable to prevent Schofield from executing a planned, orderly withdrawal to Nashville.

The Confederate assault of six infantry divisions containing eighteen brigades with 100 regiments numbering almost 20,000 men, sometimes called the "Pickett's Charge of the West", resulted in devastating losses to the men and the leadership of the Army of Tennessee—fourteen Confederate generals (six killed, seven wounded, and one captured) and 55 regimental commanders were casualties. After its defeat against Maj. Gen. George H. Thomas in the subsequent Battle of Nashville, the Army of Tennessee retreated with barely half the men with which it had begun the short offensive, and was effectively destroyed as a fighting force for the remainder of the war.

The 1864 Battle of Franklin was the second military action in the vicinity; a battle in 1863 was a minor action associated with a reconnaissance in force by Confederate cavalry leader Maj. Gen. Earl Van Dorn on April 10.

Background

Military situation

Following his defeat in the Atlanta Campaign, Hood had hoped to lure Maj. Gen. William T. Sherman into battle by disrupting his  railroad supply line from Chattanooga to Atlanta. After a brief period in which he pursued Hood, Sherman decided instead to cut his main army off from these lines and "live off the land" in his famed March to the Sea from Atlanta to Savannah. By doing so, he would avoid having to defend hundreds of miles of supply lines against constant raids, through which he predicted he would lose "a thousand men monthly and gain no result" against Hood's army.

Sherman's march left the aggressive  Hood unoccupied, and his Army of Tennessee had several options in attacking Sherman or falling upon his rear lines. The task of defending Tennessee and the rearguard against Hood fell to Maj. Gen. George H. Thomas, commander of the Army of the Cumberland. The principal forces available in Middle Tennessee were IV Corps of the Army of the Cumberland, commanded by Maj. Gen. David S. Stanley, and XXIII Corps of the Army of the Ohio, commanded by Maj. Gen. John Schofield, with a total strength of about 30,000. Another 30,000 troops under Thomas's command were in or moving toward Nashville.

Rather than trying to chase Sherman in Georgia, Hood decided that he would attempt a major offensive northward, even though his invading force of 39,000 would be outnumbered by the 60,000 Union troops in Tennessee. He would move north into Tennessee and try to defeat portions of Thomas's army in detail before they could concentrate, seize the important manufacturing and supply center of Nashville, and continue north into Kentucky, possibly as far as the Ohio River.

Hood even expected to pick up 20,000 recruits from Tennessee and Kentucky in his path of victory and then join up with Robert E. Lee's army in Virginia, a plan that historian James M. McPherson describes as "scripted in never-never land." Hood had recovered from but was affected by a couple of serious physical battle wounds to a leg and arm, which caused him pain and limited his mobility.  Hood spent the first three weeks of November quietly supplying the Army of Tennessee in northern Alabama in preparation for his offensive.

Road to Franklin, November 21–29
With a series of fast marches that covered  in three days, Hood tried to maneuver between the two armies to destroy each in detail. But Union general Schofield, commanding Stanley's IV Corps as well as his own XXIII Corps, reacted correctly with a rapid retreat from Pulaski to Columbia, which held an important bridge over the Duck River on the turnpike north. Despite suffering losses from Maj. Gen. Nathan Bedford Forrest's cavalry along the way, the Federals were able to reach Columbia and erect fortifications just hours before the Confederates arrived on November 24. From November 24 to 29, Schofield managed to block Hood at this crossing, and the "Battle of Columbia" was a series of mostly bloodless skirmishes and artillery bombardments while both sides re-gathered their armies.

On November 28, Thomas directed Schofield to begin preparations for a withdrawal north to Franklin. He was incorrectly expecting that Maj. Gen. A. J. Smith's XVI Corps arrival from Missouri was imminent and he wanted the combined force to defend against Hood on the line of the Harpeth River at Franklin instead of the Duck River at Columbia. Meanwhile, early on the morning of November 29, Hood sent Benjamin F. Cheatham's and Alexander P. Stewart's corps north on a flanking march. They crossed the Duck River at Davis's Ford east of Columbia, while two divisions of Stephen D. Lee's corps and most of the army's artillery remained on the southern bank to deceive Schofield into thinking a general assault was planned against Columbia.

Now that Hood had outflanked him by noon on November 29, Schofield's army was in critical danger. His command was split at that time between his supply wagons and artillery and part of the IV Corps, which he had sent to Spring Hill nearly ten miles north of Columbia, and the rest of the IV and XXIII corps marching from Columbia to join them. In the Battle of Spring Hill that afternoon and night, Hood had a golden opportunity to intercept and destroy the Union troops and their supply wagons, as his forces had already reached the turnpike separating the Union forces by nightfall. However, because of a series of command failures along with Hood's premature confidence that he had trapped Schofield, the Confederates failed to stop or even inflict much damage to the Union forces during the night. Both the Union infantry and supply train managed to pass Spring Hill unscathed by dawn on November 30, and soon occupied the town of Franklin  to the north. That morning, Hood was surprised and furious to discover Schofield's unexpected escape.  After an angry conference with his subordinate commanders in which he blamed everyone but himself for the mistakes, Hood ordered his army to resume its pursuit north to Franklin.

Union defensive plans
Schofield's advance guard arrived in Franklin at about 4:30 a.m. on November 30, after a forced march north from Spring Hill. Brig. Gen. Jacob Cox, commander of the 3rd Division, temporarily assumed command of the XXIII Corps and immediately began preparing strong defensive positions around the deteriorated entrenchments originally constructed for a previous engagement in 1863.

Schofield decided to defend at Franklin with his back to the river because he had no pontoon bridges available that would enable his men to cross the river.  The bridges had been left behind in his retreat from Columbia because they lacked wagons to transport them, and pontoons requested from Thomas in Nashville had not arrived. Schofield needed time to repair the permanent bridges spanning the river—a burned wagon bridge and an intact railroad bridge. He ordered his engineers to rebuild the wagon bridge and to lay planking over the undamaged railroad bridge to enable it to carry wagons and troops. His supply train parked in the side streets to keep the main pike open, while wagons continued to cross the river, first via a ford next to the burned-out pike bridge, and later in the afternoon by the two makeshift bridges. By the beginning of the assault, nearly all the supply wagons were across the Harpeth and on the road to Nashville.

By noon, the Union works were ready. The line formed an approximate semicircle around the town from northwest to southeast.  The other half of the circle was the Harpeth River. Counterclockwise from the northwest were the divisions of Kimball (IV Corps), Ruger (XXIII Corps), and Reilly (XXIII Corps). There was a gap in the line where the Columbia Pike (present day U.S. Route 31) entered the outskirts of the town, left open to allow passage of the wagons. About  behind this gap, a 150-yard "retrenchment" line was constructed of dirt and rails, which was intended to be a barrier to traffic, not a full-fledged defensive earthwork. (The gap was also defended by the guns of Battery A, 1st Kentucky Artillery. The men of the 44th Missouri also extended the retrenchment line to the west along their front with hastily dug trenches.) The actual earthworks in the southern portion of the line were formidable. Attacking infantry would be confronted by a ditch about four feet wide and two to three feet deep, then a wall of earth and wooden fence rails four feet above normal ground level, and finally a trench three to four feet deep in which the defenders stood, aiming their weapons through narrow "head gaps" formed by logs. In the southeast portion of the line, Osage-orange shrubs formed an almost impenetrable abatis. Just behind the center of the line stood the Carter House, appropriated as Cox's headquarters. Just east of the pike was the Carter cotton gin building, around which a minor salient occurred in the Union earthworks. Schofield established his headquarters in the Alpheus Truett House, a half mile north of the Harpeth on the Nashville Pike, although he would spend most of his time during the battle in Fort Granger, built in 1863 as an artillery position northeast of the town.

Two Union brigades were positioned about a half mile forward of the main line. George D. Wagner's division had been the last to arrive from Spring Hill, and after briefly stopping at Winstead Hill before Hood arrived, he ordered his brigades under Colonels Emerson Opdycke, John Q. Lane, and Joseph Conrad (who had replaced Luther Bradley, wounded at Spring Hill) to stop halfway to the Union line and dig in as best they could on the flat ground. Stanley had earlier ordered Wagner to hold Winstead Hill until dark unless he was pressed, and it is possible that Wagner somehow translated these orders into the notion that he was supposed to hold a line south of the main position. Opdycke considered Wagner's order to be ridiculous and refused to obey it; he marched his brigade through the Union line and into a reserve position behind the gap through which the Columbia Pike passed. (A few days after his ill-considered position was overrun in the Confederate advance, Wagner was relieved of command at his own request.)

Wood's division of IV Corps and all of Wilson's cavalry were posted north of the Harpeth to watch for any flanking attempt. Schofield planned to withdraw his infantry across the river by 6:00 p.m. if Hood had not arrived by then. As Hood approached, Schofield initially assumed the Confederates were demonstrating as they had at Columbia, planning to cross the Harpeth and turn the Union position. He did not suspect that Hood would be rash enough to attack the strong defensive line.

Hood's arrival and plan

Hood's army began to arrive on Winstead Hill, two miles (3 km) south of Franklin, around 1:00 p.m. Hood ordered a frontal assault in the dwindling afternoon light—sunset would be at 4:34 p.m. that day—against the Union force, a decision that caused dismay among his top generals. Forrest argued unsuccessfully that if he were given a division of infantry to accompany his cavalry, he could flank Schofield out of his position "within an hour." Frank Cheatham told Hood, "I do not like the looks of this fight; the enemy has an excellent position and is well fortified." But Hood countered that he would rather fight a Federal force that had had only a few hours to build defenses, instead of Nashville where "they have been strengthening themselves for three years." Patrick Cleburne observed the enemy fortifications as being formidable, but he told the commanding general that he would either take the enemy's works or fall in the attempt. He later remarked to Brig. Gen. Daniel C. Govan, "Well, Govan, if we are to die, let us die like men."

Some popular histories assert that Hood acted rashly in a fit of rage, resentful that the Federal army had slipped past his troops the night before at Spring Hill and that he wanted to discipline his army by ordering them to assault against strong odds. Recent scholarship discounts this as unlikely, as it was not only militarily foolish, but Hood was observed to be determined, not angry, by the time he arrived in Franklin.

Regardless of Hood's personal motivations, his specific objective was to try to crush Schofield before he and his troops could escape to Nashville.  He was concerned that if he attempted to turn Schofield by crossing the Harpeth and getting between him and Nashville, the maneuver would be time-consuming and the open terrain of the area would reveal his movements prematurely, causing Schofield to simply withdraw again. The Confederates began moving forward at 4:00 p.m., with Cheatham's corps on the left of the assault and Stewart's on the right. Bate's division, on the left, was delayed in reaching its starting point as it marched around Winstead Hill, a movement that delayed the start of the entire army. Hood divided Forrest's cavalry—Chalmer's division on the far left, beyond Bate, and Buford and Jackson with Forrest, covering Stewart and facing the fords on the Harpeth. Lee's corps, and almost all of the army's artillery, had not yet arrived from Columbia. Hood's attacking force, about 19–20,000 men, was arguably understrength for the mission he assigned—traversing two miles (3 km) of open ground with only two batteries of artillery support and then assaulting prepared fortifications.

Opposing forces

Union

Maj. Gen. John M. Schofield, commander of the Army of the Ohio, led a force of about 27,000 consisting of:
 IV Corps, commanded by Maj. Gen. David S. Stanley, with divisions commanded by Brig. Gens. Nathan Kimball, George D. Wagner, and Thomas J. Wood.
 XXIII Corps, normally commanded by Schofield, but temporarily commanded at Franklin by Brig. Gen. Jacob D. Cox, with divisions commanded by Brig. Gens. Thomas H. Ruger and James W. Reilly.
 Cavalry Corps, commanded by Maj. Gen. James H. Wilson, with divisions commanded by Brig. Gen. Edward M. McCook, Edward Hatch, Richard W. Johnson, and Joseph F. Knipe.

Confederate

Lt. Gen. John Bell Hood's Army of Tennessee, at 39,000 men, constituted the second-largest remaining army of the Confederacy, ranking in strength only after Gen. Robert E. Lee's Army of Northern Virginia. The army consisted of the corps of:
 Maj. Gen. Benjamin F. Cheatham, with divisions commanded by Maj. Gens. Patrick R. Cleburne, John C. Brown, and William B. Bate.
 Lt. Gen. Stephen D. Lee, with divisions commanded by Maj. Gens. Edward "Allegheny" Johnson, Carter L. Stevenson, and Henry D. Clayton. (Only Johnson's division played an active role at Franklin.)
 Lt. Gen. Alexander P. Stewart, with divisions commanded by Maj. Gen. William W. Loring, Samuel G. French, and Edward C. Walthall.
 Cavalry forces under Maj. Gen. Nathan Bedford Forrest, with divisions commanded by Brig. Gen. James R. Chalmers, Abraham Buford, and William H. Jackson.

At Franklin, about 27,000 Confederates were engaged, primarily from the corps of Cheatham, Stewart, and Forrest, and Johnson's division of Lee's corps.

Battle

Initial contact

Hood's attack initially enveloped the 3,000 men in two brigades under Lane and Conrad, which attempted to stand their ground behind inadequate fieldworks and without anchored flanks, but quickly collapsed under the pressure. As Wagner exhorted his men to stand fast, they let loose a single strong volley of rifle fire, and a two-gun section of Battery G, 1st Ohio Light Artillery, fired canister, but then many of the veteran soldiers of the two brigades stampeded back on the Columbia Pike to the main breastworks, while some untried replacements were reluctant to move under fire and were captured. Nearly 700 of Wagner's men were taken prisoner. The fleeing troops were closely pursued by the Confederates, and a cry was repeated along the line, "Go into the works with them." The pursued and pursuers were so intermingled that defenders in the breastworks had to hold their fire to avoid hitting their comrades.

Breakthrough and repulse in the Federal center
The Union's momentary inability to defend the opening in the works caused a weak spot in its line at the Columbia Pike from the Carter House to the cotton gin. The Confederate divisions of Cleburne, Brown, and French converged on this front and a number of their troops broke through the now not-so-solid Federal defenses on either side. The 100th Ohio Infantry, of Reilly's brigade, was driven back from its position to the east of the pike and Col. Silas A. Strickland's brigade (Ruger's division) was forced to withdraw back to the Carter House. The left wing of the 72nd Illinois Infantry was swept away and rallied on the 183rd Ohio Infantry, in reserve at the retrenchment, which prompted the remainder of the 72nd to withdraw back to that line. In a matter of minutes, the Confederates had penetrated 50 yards deep into the center of the Federal line.

As the Confederates poured men into the breach, Emerson Opdycke's brigade was in reserve, positioned in columns of regiments facing north in a meadow about 200 yards north of the Carter House. Opdycke quickly repositioned his men into line of battle, straddling the road, and they were confronted by masses of fleeing Union soldiers, pursued by Confederates. Opdycke ordered his brigade forward to the works. At the same time, his corps commander, David Stanley, arrived on the scene. He later wrote, "I saw Opdycke near the center of his line urging his men forward. I gave the Colonel no orders as I saw him engaged in doing the very thing to save us, to get possession of our line again." As he rode forward, Stanley had his horse shot out from under him and a bullet passed through the back of his neck, putting him temporarily out of action.

Opdycke's counterattack was joined by reserve elements of Reilly's division (the 12th Kentucky Infantry and 16th Kentucky Infantry) and survivors of Strickland's and Wagner's divisions. Together they sealed the breach. Hand-to-hand fighting around the Carter House and the pike was furious and desperate, employing such weapons as bayonets, rifle butts, entrenching tools, axes, and picks.

Firing continued around the Carter house and gardens for hours. Many in Brown's division were driven back to the Federal earthworks, where many were pinned down for the remainder of the evening, unable to either advance or flee. Each side fired through embrasures or over the top of the parapets at close range in an attempt to dislodge the other. Brown's division suffered significant losses, including Brown, who was wounded, and all four of his brigade commanders were casualties. Brown's brigade under Brig. Gen. George W. Gordon had angled to the right during the advance, joining Cleburne's division to the east of the pike. Their attack near the cotton gin was driven back from the breastworks and was then subjected to devastating cross fire from Reilly's brigade to their front and the brigade of Col. John S. Casement, on Reilly's right. Cleburne was killed in the attack and 14 of his brigade and regimental commanders were casualties.

That some Union troops were armed with Spencer and Henry repeating rifles added to the otherwise considerable advantages of the defenders. Near the Carter House, 350 men of the 12th Kentucky and 65th Illinois fired 16-shot, lever-action Henry rifles, the predecessors to the Winchester repeating rifle. These rifles, capable of at least 10 shots per minute, gave these men several times more firepower than typical infantrymen with the more common muzzle-loading rifle-muskets.

Repulse on the Federal left
While fighting raged at the center of the Union line, the Confederates of Stewart's corps also advanced against the Union left. Because the Harpeth River flowed in that area from southeast to northwest, the brigade found itself moving through a space getting progressively narrower, squeezing brigades together into a compressed front, delaying their movements and reducing their unit cohesion. Walthall's division was pressured so much from the right that it temporarily fell in front of Cleburne's advance. They were all subjected to fierce artillery fire not only from the main Union line, but also from the batteries across the river at Fort Granger. They also had significant difficulty pushing through the strong osage-orange abatis.

Loring's division launched two attacks against the Union brigade of Col. Israel N. Stiles and both were repulsed with heavy losses. Artillery firing canister rounds directly down the railroad cut prevented any attempt to flank the Union position. Brig. Gen. John Adams attempted to rally his brigade by galloping his horse directly onto the earthworks. As he attempted to seize the flag of the 65th Illinois, he and his horse were both shot and killed. The brigade of Brig. Gen. Winfield S. Featherston began falling back under heavy fire when its division commander, Maj. Gen. William W. Loring, confronted them, shouting, "Great God. Do I command cowards?" He attempted to inspire his men by sitting on his horse in full view of the Federal lines for over a minute and amazingly emerged unharmed, but the brigade made no further progress.

Walthall's division, intermixed partially with Loring's division because of the confusion that resulted from the narrow space, struck Casement's and Reilly's brigades in multiple waves of brigade assaults—probably as many as six distinct attacks. All of these assaults were turned back with heavy losses. The brigade of Brig. Gen. William A. Quarles was able to push through the abatis and reached the Federal earthworks, where it was pinned down by murderous crossfire. Quarles was wounded in the left arm and at the end of the battle the highest-ranking officer standing in his brigade was a captain.

Failures on the Confederate left and center
Maj. Gen. William B. Bate's division had a long distance to march to reach its assigned objective on the Union right and when he gave the final order to attack it was almost dark. First contact with the enemy came around the Everbright Mansion, the home of Rebecca Bostick, and the Confederates pushed aside Union sharpshooters and swept past the house. However, Bate's left flank was not being protected as he expected by Chalmers's cavalry division, and they received enfilade fire. To protect the flank, Bate ordered the Florida Brigade, temporarily commanded by Col. Robert Bullock, to move from its reserve position to his left flank. This not only delayed the advance, but provided only a single line to attack the Union fortifications, leaving no reserve. Chalmers's troopers had actually engaged the Federal right by this time (the brigades of Col. Isaac M. Kirby and Brig. Gen. Walter C. Whitaker of Kimball's division), fighting dismounted, but Bate was unaware of it because the two forces were separated by rolling ground and orchards. Neither Bate nor Chalmers made any progress and they withdrew.

Hood, who remained at his headquarters on Winstead Hill, was still convinced that he could pierce the Federal line. At about 7 p.m., he deployed the only division of Stephen D. Lee's corps that had arrived, commanded by Maj. Gen. Edward "Allegheny" Johnson, to assist Cheatham's effort. They moved north on the west side of the Columbia Turnpike and passed around Privet Knob, Cheatham's headquarters, but were unfamiliar with the terrain in the dark and Cheatham told Lee he had no staff officer left who could guide them. Both Bate and Cheatham warned Lee not to fire indiscriminately against the Federal works because Confederates were pinned down there on the outside. Johnson's men lost their unit alignments in the dark and had significant difficulties attacking the works just to the west of the Carter House. They were repulsed after a single assault with heavy losses.

Cavalry actions
In addition to Chalmers's actions in the west, across the river to the east Confederate cavalry commander Forrest attempted to turn the Union left. His two divisions on Stewart's right (Brig. Gens. Abraham Buford II and William H. Jackson) engaged some Federal cavalry pickets and pushed them back. When Union cavalry commander Brig. Gen. James H. Wilson learned at 3 p.m. that Forrest was crossing the river, he ordered his division under Brig. Gen. Edward Hatch to move south from his position on the Brentwood Turnpike and attack Forrest from the front. He ordered Brig. Gen. John T. Croxton's brigade to move against Forrest's flank and held Col. Thomas J. Harrison's brigade in reserve. The dismounted cavalrymen of Hatch's division charged the Confederate cavalrymen, also dismounted, and drove them back across the river. Some of Croxton's men were armed with seven-shot Spencer carbines, which had a devastating effect on the Confederate line. Wilson was proud of his men's accomplishment because this was the first time that Forrest had been defeated by a smaller force in a standup fight during the war.

Aftermath

Following the failure of Johnson's assault, Hood decided to end offensive actions for the evening and began to plan for a resumed series of attacks in the morning. Schofield ordered his infantry to cross the river, starting at 11 p.m., despite objections from Cox that withdrawal was no longer necessary and that Hood was weakened and should be counter-attacked. Schofield had received orders from Thomas to evacuate earlier that day—before Hood's attack began—and he was happy to take advantage of them despite the changed circumstances. Although there was a period in which the Union army was vulnerable, outside its works and straddling the river, Hood did not attempt to take advantage of it during the night. The Union army began entering the breastworks at Nashville at noon on December 1, with Hood's damaged army in pursuit.

The damaged Confederate force was left in control of Franklin, but its enemy had escaped again. Although he had briefly come close to breaking through in the vicinity of the Columbia Turnpike, Hood was unable to destroy Schofield or prevent his withdrawal to link up with Thomas in Nashville. And his unsuccessful result came with a frightful cost. The Confederates suffered 6,252 casualties, including 1,750 killed and 3,800 wounded. An estimated 2,000 others suffered less serious wounds and returned to duty before the Battle of Nashville. But more importantly, the military leadership in the West was decimated, including the loss of perhaps the best division commander of either side, Patrick Cleburne, who was killed in action. Fourteen Confederate generals (six killed, seven wounded, and one captured) and 55 regimental commanders were casualties. Five generals killed in action at Franklin were Cleburne, John Adams, Hiram B. Granbury, States Rights Gist, and Otho F. Strahl. A sixth general, John C. Carter, was mortally wounded and died later on December 10. The wounded generals were John C. Brown, Francis M. Cockrell, Zachariah C. Deas, Arthur M. Manigault, Thomas M. Scott, and Jacob H. Sharp. One general, Brig. Gen. George W. Gordon, was captured.  Also among the dead was Tod Carter, the middle child of the Carter family.  Having enlisted in the Confederate army three years earlier, Carter had returned to his hometown for the first time since then, only to be wounded in battle just a few hundred yards away from his own house.  He was found by his family after the battle, and died early in the next day.

Union losses were reported as only 189 killed, 1,033 wounded, and 1,104 missing. It is possible that the number of casualties was under-reported by Schofield because of the confusion during his army's hasty nighttime evacuation of Franklin. The Union wounded were left behind in Franklin. Many of the prisoners, including all captured wounded and medical personnel, were recovered on December 18 when Union forces re-entered Franklin in pursuit of Hood.

The Army of Tennessee was badly damaged at Franklin. Nevertheless, rather than retreat and risk the army dissolving through desertions, Hood advanced his 26,500 man force against the Union army now combined under Thomas, firmly entrenched at Nashville which numbered more than 60,000. Hood and his department commander Gen. P.G.T. Beauregard requested reinforcements, but none were available. Strongly outnumbered and exposed to the elements, Hood was attacked by Thomas on December 15–16 at the Battle of Nashville, defeated decisively and pursued aggressively, retreating to Mississippi with just under 20,000 men. The Army of Tennessee never fought again as an effective force and Hood's career was ruined.

Perhaps surprisingly, some Confederate soldiers claimed that Franklin was a victory. James Lanning of the 25th Alabama Infantry wrote in his diary, “victory is ours but very dearly bought.” Confederate artilleryman William Ritter believed, “the charge was a brilliant one and was successful, as part of the enemy’s line was captured.” Joseph Boyce of the 1st Missouri Infantry acknowledged that many men considered Franklin a victory for the Confederate army since it held the battlefield at the end of the fighting. However Boyce, who was wounded at Franklin, also noted “two such victories will wipe out any army.”

Hood's continued pursuit of Schofield after suffering defeat at Franklin and his refusal to withdraw before the battle of Nashville caused Schofield to remark "I doubt if any soldiers in the world ever needed more cumulative evidence to convince them that they were beaten."

In his Pulitzer Prize-winning book Battle Cry of Freedom, James M. McPherson wrote, "Having proved even to Hood's satisfaction that they could assault breastworks, the Army of Tennessee had shattered itself beyond the possibility of ever doing so again. David J. Eicher wrote that Hood "had in effect mortally wounded his army at Franklin."

Battlefield today

The Carter House, which stands today and is open to visitors, was located at the center of the Union position. The house and outbuildings still show hundreds of bullet holes. The  Carnton Plantation, home to the McGavock family during the battle, also still stands and is likewise open to the public. The Carnton Plantation home was one of 44 Franklin homes serving as a hospital, often with 30 wounded in each small room of the house. Confederate soldiers of Stewart's Corps swept past Carnton toward the left wing of the Union army and the house and outbuildings were converted into the largest field hospital present after the battle. Adjacent to Carnton is the McGavock Confederate Cemetery, where 1,481 Southern soldiers killed in the battle are buried. Adjacent to the  surrounding Carnton is another  of battlefield, formerly the Franklin Country Club golf course, which is currently being converted to a city park.

Much of the rest of the Franklin battlefield has been lost to commercial development. The spot where Gen. Cleburne fell, for instance, was covered until late 2005 by a Pizza Hut restaurant. City officials and historic-preservation groups have recently placed a new emphasis on saving what remains of the land over which the battle raged.

In 2006,  of land bordering the southwestern end of the Carter House property was acquired with help of the American Battlefield Trust and local organizations. This land was part of  that made up the Carter Family Garden, which during the battle saw tremendous fighting and was part of a brief Confederate breakthrough. After the purchase, a house, out-buildings, and a swimming pool were removed. During excavation of the original Federal entrenchments some human bones were found.

Starting in 2005, the area around the intersection of Columbia Ave. and Cleburne St. has seen a serious renewed effort to reclaim that area to be the heart of a future battlefield park. The location of the former Pizza Hut is now the home to Cleburne Park. The property where the Carter Cotton Gin was located during the battle was purchased in 2005. In 2008 the property behind this location and where the Federal line crossed Columbia Ave. was purchased and in May 2010 the property east of the Gin location and where part of the Gin may have stood was also purchased. All these locations have houses on them that will be either sold and moved or torn down. Preservation organizations plan to reconstruct both the Carter Cotton Gin and some of the Federal entrenchments.

On November 24, 2010, the State of Tennessee awarded a $960,000 enhancement grant from the Tennessee Department of Transportation to help purchase the property where the Domino's Pizza and mini-mart is located. A local preservation organization is also hoping to purchase 16 acres of land in two parcels: five acres located southwest of what is now a small park called the Collin's Farm located at the southeast corner of the Lewisburg Pike and the Nashville and Decatur Railroad that was preserved a few years ago; and 11 acres located near the corner of Lewisburg Pike and Carnton Lane.

In popular culture
In the book Gone with the Wind by Margaret Mitchell, the character Rhett Butler mentions that he fought at Franklin.

See also

 Armies in the American Civil War
 Franklin-Nashville Campaign
 List of costliest American Civil War land battles
 Sherman's March
 Troop engagements of the American Civil War, 1864

References
Notes

Bibliography

 Connelly, Thomas L. Autumn of Glory: The Army of Tennessee 1862–1865. Baton Rouge: Louisiana State University Press, 1971. .
 Eicher, David J. The Longest Night: A Military History of the Civil War. New York: Simon & Schuster, 2001. .
 Esposito, Vincent J. West Point Atlas of American Wars. New York: Frederick A. Praeger, 1959. . The collection of maps (without explanatory text) is available online at the West Point website.
 Hood, Stephen M. John Bell Hood: The Rise, Fall, and Resurrection of a Confederate General. El Dorado Hills, CA: Savas Beatie, 2013. .
 Hood, Stephen M. The Lost Papers of Confederate General John Bell Hood.  El Dorado Hills, CA: Savas Beatie, 2015. .
 Horn, Stanley F. The Army of Tennessee: A Military History. Indianapolis: Bobbs-Merrill, 1941. .
 Jacobson, Eric A., and Richard A. Rupp. For Cause & for Country: A Study of the Affair at Spring Hill and the Battle of Franklin. Franklin, TN: O'More Publishing, 2007. .
 Kennedy, Frances H., ed. The Civil War Battlefield Guide. 2nd ed. Boston: Houghton Mifflin Co., 1998. .
 McPherson, James M., ed. Battle Chronicles of the Civil War: 1864. Connecticut: Grey Castle Press, 1989. . First published in 1989 by McMillan.
 McPherson, James M. Battle Cry of Freedom: The Civil War Era. Oxford History of the United States. New York: Oxford University Press, 1988. .
 Nevin, David, and the Editors of Time-Life Books. Sherman's March: Atlanta to the Sea. Alexandria, Virginia: Time-Life Books, 1986. .
 Sword, Wiley. The Confederacy's Last Hurrah: Spring Hill, Franklin, and Nashville. Lawrence: University Press of Kansas, 1993. . First published with the title Embrace an Angry Wind in 1992 by HarperCollins.
 Thrasher, Christopher David. Suffering in the Army of Tennessee: A Social History of the Confederate Army of the Heartland from the Battles for Atlanta to the Retreat from Nashville. 2021.
 Welcher, Frank J. The Union Army, 1861–1865 Organization and Operations. Vol. 2, The Western Theater. Bloomington: Indiana University Press, 1993. .
 White, William Lee.  "Let Us Die Like Men: The Battle of Franklin, November 30, 1864". Savas Beatie 2019. 
 National Park Service battle summary
 CWSAC report update

Memoirs and primary sources
 Hood, John Bell. Advance and Retreat: Personal Experiences in the United States and Confederate States Armies. Lincoln: University of Nebraska Press, 1996. . First published 1880 for the Hood Orphan Memorial Fund by G.T. Beauregard.
 U.S. War Department, The War of the Rebellion: a Compilation of the Official Records of the Union and Confederate Armies. Washington, DC: U.S. Government Printing Office, 1880–1901.

Further reading

 Cox, Jacob D. The Battle of Franklin, Tennessee, November 30, 1864: A Monograph. Dayton, OH: Morningside Bookshop, 1983. . First published 1897 by Charles Scribner's Sons.
 Foote, Shelby. The Civil War: A Narrative. Vol. 3, Red River to Appomattox. New York: Random House, 1974. .
 McDonough, James L., and Thomas L. Connelly. Five Tragic Hours: The Battle of Franklin. Knoxville: University of Tennessee Press, 1983. .
 White, William Lee. Let Us Die like Men: The Battle of Franklin, November 30, 1864. Emerging Civil War Series. El Dorado Hills, CA: Savas Beatie, 2019. .
 "Letter, Alonzo Wolverton to his sister Roseltha Wolverton Goble, December 4, 1864," Examples of Wolverton Family Letters from Darroch Donation, Archives of Ontario. Accessed 8 September 2018 http://www.archives.gov.on.ca/en/explore/online/fenians/darroch_acquisition.aspx

External links

 Battle of Franklin: Battle Maps, histories, photos, and preservation news (Civil War Trust)
Animated map of the Battle of Franklin (Civil War Trust)
 A blog-database for descendants of the Battle of Franklin
 Google Map of the Battle of Franklin
 Battle of Franklin.net
 Animated history of the Franklin-Nashville Campaign 
 Save the Franklin Battlefield, Inc.
 Carter House Museum
 Carnton Plantation
 McGavock Confederate Cemetery
 West Point Atlas map, Battles of Spring Hill and Franklin
 Historic map of Franklin, Tennessee Civil War Preservation Association
 John Bell Hood Society's defense of Hood's 1864 Tennessee campaign
 On this date in Civil War history – Battle of Franklin – November 30, 1864

1864 in Tennessee
Franklin II
Franklin II
Franklin 1864
Nathan Bedford Forrest
John Bell Hood
Franklin, Tennessee
Franklin II
Franklin II
Franklin II
Williamson County, Tennessee
November 1864 events